Mbiywom (Mbeiwum) is an extinct Australian Aboriginal language formerly spoken by the Mbiywom people around the areas of Cape York and Cook Shire in Far North Queensland.

Alternative names 

 Bywoom
 Kok Mbewam / KokMbewam / KokMbewan
 Kokimoh / Kokinno
 M Berwum
 Mbe:wum / Mbeiwum / Mbewum
 Uradhi

References

Northern Paman languages
Extinct languages of Queensland